Bálint Kopasz (born 20 June 1997) is a Hungarian sprint canoeist. He competed in the men's K-1 1000 metres event at the 2016 Summer Olympics. He won the same event in the 2020 Summer Olympics.

References

External links
 

1997 births
Living people
Hungarian male canoeists
Olympic canoeists of Hungary
Canoeists at the 2016 Summer Olympics
Sportspeople from Szeged
Canoeists at the 2019 European Games
European Games medalists in canoeing
European Games gold medalists for Hungary
ICF Canoe Sprint World Championships medalists in kayak
Canoeists at the 2020 Summer Olympics
Medalists at the 2020 Summer Olympics
Olympic medalists in canoeing
Olympic gold medalists for Hungary
21st-century Hungarian people